Erik de Vogel (born 2 May 1961) is a Dutch actor. He is known for playing the role of Ludo Sanders in the soap opera Goede tijden, slechte tijden for over 20 years.

Career 

 the father of Marly van der Velden's Nina Mauricius–Sanders whom also is a villain.

De Vogel played the role of Hoofdpiet between 1994 and 1997 during the annual arrival of Sinterklaas in the Netherlands. He also appeared in this role in the 1995 television film Pepernoten voor Sinterklaas and in the television show Telekids. De Vogel also made a cameo appearance in the 2019 film De Brief voor Sinterklaas.

In 2005, he had a guest role in the film Deuce Bigalow: European Gigolo.

In 2019, he played the lead role in the film Nachtwacht: Het Duistere Hart.

Personal life 

De Vogel has a daughter with Caroline De Bruijn. De Bruijn plays the role of Janine Elschot in Goede tijden, slechte tijden.

Selected filmography

Television 

 1991: 12 steden, 13 ongelukken (1 episode)
 1993: Bureau Kruislaan (1 episode)
 1994: De laatste carrière (1 episode)
 1996: Verhalen uit de bijbel (1 episode)
 1996: Baantjer (1 episode)
 1996 – present: Goede tijden, slechte tijden
 2018 – 2019: De TV kantine

Film 

 1995: Pepernoten voor Sinterklaas (television film)
 1995: Flodder 3
 1998: Goede tijden, slechte tijden: De reünie (television film)
 2005: Deuce Bigalow: European Gigolo
 2014: Kris Kras
 2019: De Brief voor Sinterklaas
 2019: Nachtwacht: Het Duistere Hart

References

External links 

 

1961 births
Living people
Dutch male film actors
Dutch male television actors
Dutch male soap opera actors
People from Haarlem
20th-century Dutch male actors
21st-century Dutch male actors